Childeric II (c. 653 – 675) was the king of Austrasia from 662 and of Neustria and Burgundy from 673 until his death, making him sole King of the Franks for the final two years of his life.

Childeric was the second eldest son of King Clovis II and grandson of King Dagobert I and Queen Nanthild. His mother was Saint Balthild and his elder brother was Chlothar III, who was briefly sole king from 661, but gave Austrasia to Childeric the next year. He was still a mere child when he was raised on the shields of his warriors and proclaimed king in Austrasia.

After the death of Chlothar in 673, Theuderic III, his youngest brother, inherited his kingdoms, but a faction of prominent Burgundian nobles led by Saint Leodegar and Adalrich invited Childeric to become king in Neustria and Burgundy. He soon invaded his brother's kingdom and displaced him, becoming sole king. He made his Austrasian Mayor of the Palace, Wulfoald, mayor also in Neustria and Burgundy, displacing Ebroin of Neustria and upsetting his supporters in Burgundy who did not wish to see functionaries active in a kingdom other than their native one. In March 675, Childeric had granted honores in Alsace to Adalrich with the title of dux. This grant was most probably the result of Adalrich's continued support for Childeric in Burgundy, which had often disputed possession of Alsace with Austrasia.

The final straw for the magnates of Neustria, however, was Childeric's illegal corporal punishment of the nobleman named Bodilo. Bodilo and his friends Amalbert and Ingobert conspired to assassinate the king, who was killed, along with his wife, Bilichild, and his five-year-old son, Dagobert, while hunting in the forest of Livry (present-day Lognes). He was buried in Saint-Germain-des-Prés, near Paris, where the tombs of him, Bilichild, and his young son Dagobert were discovered in 1645; the contents of which were pilfered.

Childeric married his cousin Bilichild. Besides the aforementioned Dagobert, she bore him the future king Chilperic II.

References

Sources

External links

Merovingian kings
Frankish warriors
653 births
675 deaths
Medieval child monarchs
7th-century murdered monarchs
Burials at Saint-Germain-des-Prés (abbey)
7th-century Frankish kings